Peter Becker (born 16 July 1956 in Geisenheim) is a West German rower who competed at the 1976 Summer Olympics in double sculls. Together with Gerhard Kroschewski, he came fifth.

References

1956 births
Living people
Olympic rowers of West Germany
Rowers at the 1976 Summer Olympics
West German male rowers